William Peter Filson (born September 28, 1958) is a retired Major League Baseball pitcher. He played during seven seasons at the major league level for the Minnesota Twins, Chicago White Sox, New York Yankees, and Kansas City Royals.

Playing career
Filson attended Temple University, and in 1977 and 1978 he played collegiate summer baseball with the Hyannis Mets of the Cape Cod Baseball League. He was selected by the Yankees in the 9th round of the 1979 MLB Draft. 

Filson played his first professional season with their Rookie league Paintsville Yankees and Class-A (Short Season) Oneonta Yankees in 1979, and split his last between Kansas City and their Triple-A Omaha Royals in 1990. Filson can be seen delivering a single pitch as a Royal in the Ken Burns documentary Baseball, at the beginning of the section entitled "Extra Innings."

He was dealt along with Larry Milbourne and John Pacella from the Yankees to the Twins for Butch Wynegar and Roger Erickson on May 12, 1982.

With the Twins, Filson was affectionately nicknamed "Freeze".

Coaching career
In 2003 Filson was hired as pitching coach for the Newark Bears of the independent Atlantic League, Filson remained with the team until 2006.

Filson is currently a pitching instructor at AFC Baseball in Bala Cynwyd, Pennsylvania, where he provides instruction to players at Harriton High School, Radnor High School, the Chester County Crawdads, and Wayne Wolverines.

References

External links

 www.afcbaseball.com

1958 births
Living people
People from Darby, Pennsylvania
Minnesota Twins players
Chicago White Sox players
New York Yankees players
Kansas City Royals players
Nashville Sounds players
Major League Baseball pitchers
Baseball players from Pennsylvania
Paintsville Yankees players
Omaha Royals players
Baseball City Royals players
Memphis Chicks players
Oneonta Yankees players
Fort Lauderdale Yankees players
Greensboro Hornets players
Columbus Clippers players
Toledo Mud Hens players
Buffalo Bisons (minor league) players
Temple Owls baseball players
Hyannis Harbor Hawks players
Gulf Coast Yankees players
Sportspeople from Delaware County, Pennsylvania